New Hampshire's 13th State Senate district is one of 24 districts in the New Hampshire Senate. It has  been represented by Democrat Cindy Rosenwald since 2018, succeeding fellow Democrat Bette Lasky.

Geography
District 13 is based in Nashua in Hillsborough County, including the city's 3rd, 4th, 6th, 7th, 8th, and 9th wards.

The district is located entirely within New Hampshire's 2nd congressional district. It borders the state of Massachusetts. At just under 16 square miles, it is the smallest Senate district in the state.

Recent election results

2020

2018

2016

2014

2012

Federal and statewide results in District 13

References

13
Hillsborough County, New Hampshire